The Fiji national futsal team was formed by the Fiji Football Association, the governing body of futsal in Fiji and represents the country in international futsal competitions. The current coach is Imtiaz Khan, a former striker of the Suva soccer team. Khan was signed in 2009.

Tournament records

FIFA Futsal World Cup record

Oceanian Futsal Championship record

Current squad

The team comprises players from six districts and all players named are of Indo-Fijian ethnicity. Six southern, two western and four northern division players have made the team.

 From Lautoka : Alvin Avinesh, Arvindra Naidu.
 From Labasa  : Azmat Begg, Imtiaz Begg, Dinesh Mudliar, Sandeep Nair.
 From Rewa : Kamal Hassan, Wasim Ali. 
 From Navua : Siga Ali.
 From Nasinu : Ashish Chand.
 From Suva : Vikash Prasad, Mira Hussein Sahib.

References

Oceanian national futsal teams
Futsal
Futsal in Fiji